The Kryvyi Rih Metropolitan Region, or Kryvbas, is an urban area in central Ukraine (by the most part). With a population of one million, it is one of the largest urban regions in Ukraine. It consists of a couple big industrial cities and some smaller ones, townsides and rural areas.

From east to west, the region includes the cities of Kryvyi Rih, Zhovti Vody, Oleksandriia, Novyi Buh as well as parts of the more rural districts and (factually) includes far more territories in central and southern parts of Ukraine. The Kryvyi Rih metro area doesn't have an administrative center; each city in the area has its own administration.

History
The presence of iron ore in the regions around Kryvyi Rih has been known since at least 1781 and was rumoured before; being known to the ancients. Throughout the 1800s the region was investigated for its mineral wealth.  Iron ore of 70% iron content and manganese ores were found. In 1881 the industrial extraction of iron ore from the near region began, alongside other developments such as the construction of the Kryvyi Rih railway. By 1884 over 100,000 tons of iron ore had been extracted, and the railway though Kryvyi Rih (the Yekateryninska railway), 477 versts (505,6 km) long, from Yasynuvata station via Kryvyi Rih to Dolynska station had been opened. The production expanded rapidly in the next years, as it did in other industrialized regions and countries. By 1896 there were 20 mines producing over 1,000,000 tonnes of ore in the Kryvyi Rih Basin, and the population had exploded though the toll on the health of the working men had begun to be noticed. Industrial expansion continued in the region up to 1917.  Production dropped during the first world war due to lack of labour.

After the formation of the Soviet Union and the expulsion of Austro-Hungarian forces and then anti-communist forces under Anton Denikin occupying the region relative normalcy was resumed. Planning for the Kryvorizhstal began in 1929, with the intention being to produce an integrated steel plant taking iron ore and carbon all the way to finished steel products. In 1931 the chairman of the Supreme Economic Council of the USSR - Grigori (Sergo) Ordzhonikidze signed a decree ordering its construction and the same year the foundation stone of the metallurgical works was laid, workers included prison labourers, and initially German and Americans as well. In August 1934 the first metal was produced at Kryvorizhstal; then known as 'Kryvyi Rih Metallurgical Works' (криворожский металлургический комбинат)

Before the onset second world war the works operated 3 blast furnaces (of 3,160m3) and 2 open hearth furnaces along with a heat and power Kryvorizhstal, in 1941 a blooming mill of 1.7 million tonnes p.a. and a fourth blast furnace and a third open hearth furnace came on line shortly before nazi occupation.

Prior to occupation by German military forces equipment and workers were evacuated to Nizhny Tagil in Siberia. During the German administration (from the 14th of August 1941 to the 22nd of February 1944), the Kryvorizhstal was destroyed.

After the recapture of the area the complex was rebuilt, and continued to grow again; blast furnace No.7 was built in 1962, in 1970 blast furnace No.8 was built making the Kryvorizhstal the largest in Europe, and in 1974 blast furnace No.9 was opened the biggest in the world with a volume of 5000m3.

Steel companies of the region (except Mittal Steel-owned Kryvorizhstal) are controlled by either the Privat Group or  Rinat Akhmetov's SCM Holdings. From the 1990s until 2004, these once united and state-owned industries went through a hard and scandal-ridden process of privatization.

Economy

The economy is largely based on industry and exports.

Largest companies

 ArcelorMittal
 Metinvest
 Privat Group
 SCM Holdings
 Northern Iron Ore Enrichment Works
 Ingulets Iron Ore Enrichment Works
 Central Iron Ore Enrichment Works

Transport

Public transport
All public transport companies in the Kryvyi Rih are local government owned. The Kryvyi Rih region is integrated into the national rail system, the Ukrainian Railways, for both passenger and cargo services.

Road transport
The motorway network of Kryvyi Rih  includes dozens of local roads crossing the region in addition to the H11 motorway, mostly used by through traffic. Other ways have a more regional function. Both have missing links, in various stages of planning. Some missing sections are currently not planned to be constructed.

Air transport
Kryvyi Rih Airport is the intercontinental airport for region and is within 17 km of the city area.

Notes

Metropolitan areas of Ukraine